Bernhard Larsson (14 August 1879 – 1 August 1947) was a Swedish sport shooter who competed in the 1912 Summer Olympics.

In 1912 he won the gold medal as member of the Swedish team in the team free rifle competition and the bronze medal in the team military rifle event. He also participated in the 300 metre free rifle, three positions and finished in sixth place.

References

External links
profile

1879 births
1947 deaths
Swedish male sport shooters
ISSF rifle shooters
Olympic shooters of Sweden
Shooters at the 1912 Summer Olympics
Olympic gold medalists for Sweden
Olympic bronze medalists for Sweden
Olympic medalists in shooting
Medalists at the 1912 Summer Olympics
Sportspeople from Örebro
19th-century Swedish people
20th-century Swedish people